Jonathan Mark Pearce (born 23 December 1959) is an English sports commentator on football for the BBC and BT Sport. He worked for Radio Five Live and Match of the Day, as well as participating in other lower-profile sports programmes.

Early life and career
Growing up, Pearce had the intention of becoming a footballer for Bristol City. His football career subsequently ended when he broke his leg at age 14. As a young boy, he used to commentate on games of Subbuteo he played at his home. His career in broadcasting began working part time at BBC Radio Bristol, and his first match commentary was Bristol Rovers against Exeter City in the League Cup.

He became a sports editor at the age of 23. In 1987, he moved to London and Capital Radio where he launched Capital Gold Sportstime on Capital Gold a year later. He commentated on a handful of minor Premier League games for Sky Sports in the 1992–93 season, before his Radio 5 Live and Match of the Day career.

Between 1998 and 2004, Pearce commentated on the Robot Wars TV series, on BBC Two and Channel 5, a role he reprised for the rebooted 2016 series.

Channel 5, BBC and BT Sport

When Channel 5 (known as Five for some time) was launched in 1997, Pearce was signed as their lead football commentator. His excitable style of commentary received criticism from some quarters. He joined BBC Radio Five Live in 2002 and was part of their 2002 FIFA World Cup commentary team. He went on to present the station's midweek sports programme Sport on Five from 2003 until 2005 and became a commentator for BBC television on Match of the Day in 2004.

He also lent his voice to Sensible Soccer, Ubisoft football game Action Soccer and UEFA Striker. Away from football, he was also the commentator on the programmes Robot Wars and Hole in the Wall. In 2005, he guest-starred in the Doctor Who audio drama The Game, in which he played a sports commentator named Garny Diblick. Pearce's Robot Wars commentary was used in an episode of the Emmy award-winning drama The Sopranos.

Pearce joined the BBC's Match of the Day team in 2004. He is one of the BBC's front-line commentators alongside number one commentator Guy Mowbray, Steve Wilson and Simon Brotherton. During his fifteen years with BBC Sport, Pearce has commentated on live games from the FA Cup, League Cup and Championship, as well as covering five World Cups (2006, 2010, 2014, 2018 and 2022), four European Championships (2008, 2012, 2016 and 2020), two Women's World Cups (2015 and 2019) and a Women's European Championship (2022).

Pearce joined BT Sport in 2013 where he regularly commentates on Champions League and Ligue 1 fixtures.

Personal life
Pearce is a long-time Bristol City fan. He lives in Hassocks, West Sussex, where he is the former chair of the junior section of Hassocks F.C.

References

External links 

1959 births
Living people
Mass media people from Plymouth, Devon
English association football commentators
People educated at Queen Elizabeth's Hospital, Bristol
People from Hassocks